The Aṅguttara Nikāya (also translated "Gradual Collection" or "Numerical Discourses") is a Buddhist scriptures collection, the fourth of the five Nikāyas, or collections, in the Sutta Pitaka, which is one of the "three baskets" that comprise the Pali Tipitaka of Theravada Buddhism. This nikaya consists of several thousand discourses ascribed to the Lord Buddha and his chief disciples arranged in eleven "books", according to the number of Dhamma items referenced in them.

The Anguttara Nikaya corresponds to the Ekottara Āgama ("Increased by One Discourses") found in the Sutra Pitikas of various Sanskritic early Buddhists schools, fragments of which survive in Sanskrit. A complete version survives in Chinese translation by the name Zēngyī Ahánjīng (增一阿含經); it is thought to be from either the Mahāsāṃghika or Sarvāstivādin recensions. According to Keown, "there is considerable disparity between the Pāli and the Sarvāstivādin versions, with more than two-thirds of the sūtras found in one but not the other compilation, which suggests that much of this portion of the Sūtra Piṭaka was not formed until a fairly late date."

Translations

Full translation 

The Book of the Gradual Sayings, tr F. L. Woodward & E. M. Hare, 1932–6, 5 volumes, Pali Text Society, Bristol
Numerical Discourses of the Buddha, tr Bhikkhu Bodhi, 2012, 1 volume, Wisdom Publications , Somerville, MA
Bhikkhu Sujato (trans.), The “Numbered” or “Numerical” Discourses, 2018, published online at SuttaCentral and released into the public domain.

Selections 

 1st 3 nipatas tr E. R. J. Gooneratne, Ceylon, c1913
 4th nipata tr A. D. Jayasundare, London, 1925
 anthology ed & tr Nyanaponika, Buddhist Publication Society, Kandy, Sri Lanka; revised, with additions & deletions, by Bodhi, as Numerical Discourses of the Buddha, Altamira Press, Oxford/New York/Lanham, Maryland/Walnut Creek, California, 1999

Divisions 
The nipatas in this nikaya are:

Ekakanipāto (The Book of Ones) 

 1. Rūpādivaggo
 2. Nīvaraṇappahānavaggo
 3. Akammaniyavaggo
 4. Adantavaggo
 5. Paṇihitaacchavaggo
 6. Accharāsaṅghātavaggo
 7. Vīriyārambhādivaggo
 8. Kalyāṇamittādivaggo
 9. Pamādādivaggo
 10. Dutiyapamādādivaggo
 11. Adhammavaggo
 12. Anāpattivaggo
 13. Ekapuggalavaggo
 14. Etadaggavaggo
 15. Aṭṭhānapāḷi
 16. Ekadhammapāḷi
 17. Pasādakaradhammavaggo
 18. Aparaaccharāsaṅghātavaggo
 19. Kāyagatāsativaggo
 20. Amatavaggo

Dukanipāto (The Book of Twos) 

 1. Kammakaraṇavaggo
 2. Adhikaraṇavaggo
 3. Bālavaggo
 4. Samacittavaggo
 5. Parisavaggo
 (6) 1. Puggalavaggo
 (7) 2. Sukhavaggo
 (8) 3. Sanimittavaggo
 (9) 4. Dhammavaggo
 (10) 5. Bālavaggo
 (11) 1. Āsāduppajahavaggo
 (12) 2. Āyācanavaggo
 (13) 3. Dānavaggo
 (14) 4. Santhāravaggo
 (15) 5. Samāpattivaggo
 1. Kodhapeyyālaṃ
 2. Akusalapeyyālaṃ
 3. Vinayapeyyālaṃ
 4. Rāgapeyyālaṃ

Tikanipāto (The Book of Threes) 

 1. Bālavaggo
 2. Rathakāravaggo
 3. Puggalavaggo
 4. Devadūtavaggo
 5. Cūḷavaggo
 (6) 1. Brāhmaṇavaggo
 (7) 2. Mahāvaggo
 (8) 3. Ānandavaggo
 (9) 4. Samaṇavaggo
 (10) 5. Loṇakapallavaggo
 (11) 1. Sambodhavaggo
 (12) 2. Āpāyikavaggo
 (13) 3. Kusināravaggo
 (14) 4. Yodhājīvavaggo
 (15) 5. Maṅgalavaggo
 (16) 6. Acelakavaggo
 (17) 7. Kammapathapeyyālaṃ
 (18) 8. Rāgapeyyālaṃ

Catukkanipāto (The Book of Fours) 

 1. Bhaṇḍagāmavaggo
 2. Caravaggo
 3. Uruvelavaggo
 4. Cakkavaggo
 5. Rohitassavaggo
 (6) 1. Puññābhisandavaggo
 (7) 2. Pattakammavaggo
 (8) 3. Apaṇṇakavaggo
 (9) 4. Macalavaggo
 (10) 5. Asuravaggo
 (11) 1. Valāhakavaggo
 (12) 2. Kesivaggo
 (13) 3. Bhayavaggo
 (14) 4. Puggalavaggo
 (15) 5. Ābhāvaggo
 (16) 1. Indriyavaggo
 (17) 2. Paṭipadāvaggo
 (18) 3. Sañcetaniyavaggo
 (19) 4. Brāhmaṇavaggo
 (20) 5. Mahāvaggo
 (21) 1. Sappurisavaggo
 (22) 2. Parisāvaggo
 (23) 3. Duccaritavaggo
 (24) 4. Kammavaggo
 (25) 5. Āpattibhayavaggo
 (26) 6. Abhiññāvaggo
 (27) 7. Kammapathavaggo
 (28) 8. Rāgapeyyālaṃ

Pañcakanipāto (The Book of Fives) 

 1. Sekhabalavaggo
 2. Balavaggo
 3. Pañcaṅgikavaggo
 4. Sumanavaggo
 5. Muṇḍarājavaggo
 (6) 1. Nīvaraṇavaggo
 (7) 2. Saññāvaggo
 (8) 3. Yodhājīvavaggo
 (9) 4. Theravaggo
 (10) 5. Kakudhavaggo
 (11) 1. Phāsuvihāravaggo
 (12) 2. Andhakavindavaggo
 (13) 3. Gilānavaggo
 (14) 4. Rājavaggo
 (15) 5. Tikaṇḍakīvaggo
 (16) 1. Saddhammavaggo
 (17) 2. Āghātavaggo
 (18) 3. Upāsakavaggo
 (19) 4. Araññavaggo
 (20) 5. Brāhmaṇavaggo
 (21) 1. Kimilavaggo
 (22) 2. Akkosakavaggo
 (23) 3. Dīghacārikavaggo
 (24) 4. Āvāsikavaggo
 (25) 5. Duccaritavaggo
 (26) 6. Upasampadāvaggo
 1. Sammutipeyyālaṃ
 2. Sikkhāpadapeyyālaṃ
 3. Rāgapeyyālaṃ

Chakkanipāto (The Book of Sixes) 

 1. Āhuneyyavaggo
 2. Sāraṇīyavaggo
 3. Anuttariyavaggo
 4. Devatāvaggo
 5. Dhammikavaggo
 6. Mahāvaggo
 7. Devatāvaggo
 8. Arahattavaggo
 9. Sītivaggo
 10. Ānisaṃsavaggo
 11. Tikavaggo
 12. Sāmaññavaggo
 13. Rāgapeyyālaṃ

Sattakanipāto (The Book of Sevens) 

 1. Dhanavaggo
 2. Anusayavaggo
 3. Vajjisattakavaggo
 4. Devatāvaggo
 5. Mahāyaññavaggo
 6. Abyākatavaggo
 7. Mahāvaggo
 8. Vinayavaggo
 9. Samaṇavaggo
 10. Āhuneyyavaggo
 11. Rāgapeyyālaṃ

Aṭṭhakanipāto  (The Book of Eights) 

 1. Mettāvaggo
 2. Mahāvaggo
 3. Gahapativaggo
 4. Dānavaggo
 5. Uposathavaggo
 (6) 1. Gotamīvaggo
 (7) 2. Bhūmicālavaggo
 (8) 3. Yamakavaggo
 (9) 4. Sativaggo
 (10) 5. Sāmaññavaggo
 (11). Rāgapeyyālaṃ

Navakanipāto (The Book of Nines) 

 1. Sambodhivaggo
 2. Sīhanādavaggo
 3. Sattāvāsavaggo
 4. Mahāvaggo
 5. Sāmaññavaggo
 (6) 1. Khemavaggo
 (7) 2. Satipaṭṭhānavaggo
 (8) 3. Sammappadhānavaggo
 (9) 4. Iddhipādavaggo
 (10) 5. Rāgapeyyālaṃ

Dasakanipāto (The Book of Tens) 

 1. Ānisaṃsavaggo
 2. Nāthavaggo
 3. Mahāvaggo
 4. Upālivaggo
 5. Akkosavaggo
 (6) 1. Sacittavaggo
 (7) 2. Yamakavaggo
 (8) 3. Ākaṅkhavaggo
 (9) 4. Theravaggo
 (10) 5. Upālivaggo
 (11) 1. Samaṇasaññāvaggo
 (12) 2. Paccorohaṇivaggo
 (13) 3. Parisuddhavaggo
 (14) 4. Sādhuvaggo
 (15) 5. Ariyavaggo
 (16) 1. Puggalavaggo
 (17) 2. Jāṇussoṇivaggo
 (18) 3. Sādhuvaggo
 (19) 4. Ariyamaggavaggo
 (20) 5. Aparapuggalavaggo
 (21) 1. Karajakāyavaggo
 (22) 2. Sāmaññavaggo
 23. Rāgapeyyālaṃ

Ekādasako nipāto (The Book of Elevens) 

 1. Nissayavaggo
 2. Anussativaggo
 3. Sāmaññavaggo
 4. Rāgapeyyālaṃ

Appreciation 
Translator Bhikkhu Bodhi wrote: "In Anguttara Nikaya, persons are as a rule not reduced to mere collections of aggregates, elements, and sense-bases, but are treated as real centers of living experience engaged in a heartfelt quest for happiness and freedom from suffering." (from Intro to Samyutta Nikaya)

See also 
 Early Buddhist Texts
 Digha Nikaya
 Khuddaka Nikaya
 Majjhima Nikaya
 Pali Canon
 Samyutta Nikaya
 Sutta Piṭaka
 Dīghajāṇu Sutta

References

External links

Anguttara Nikaya in Pali, English and Sinhala (metta.lk)
English Translations of the Anguttara Nikaya (accesstoinsight.org)
 English translations by Bhikkhu Bodhi of selected Suttas from the Anguttara Nikaya at Wisdom Publications

 
Theravada Buddhist texts